The Delta Discovery is a weekly newspaper serving Bethel, Alaska, and the villages of the Yukon–Kuskokwim Delta and Bristol Bay regions of southwestern Alaska. Its motto is "Real news for the real people". ("Real people" is a rough translation of the indigenous name of the local tribe.)

External links
 

Bethel, Alaska
Newspapers published in Alaska